Nemėžis Manor is a former residential manor in Nemėžis, near Vilnius, Lithuania.

History
Previously it was owned by Radziwiłł, Sapieha, Chodkiewicz and Ogiński noble families.

References

Manor houses in Lithuania
Classicism architecture in Lithuania